Hugo Balduino de Sousa (born 5 March 1987) is a Brazilian sprinter specialising in the 400 metres. He represented his country at the 2013 and 2015 World Championships in Athletics.

International competitions

Personal bests
Outdoor
200 metres – 20.68 (+1.1 m/s, Rio de Janeiro 2009)
400 metres – 45.09 (Santiago de Chile 2014)

References

External links

1987 births
Living people
Brazilian male sprinters
World Athletics Championships athletes for Brazil
Pan American Games athletes for Brazil
Athletes (track and field) at the 2015 Pan American Games
Place of birth missing (living people)
Athletes (track and field) at the 2016 Summer Olympics
Olympic athletes of Brazil
South American Games gold medalists for Brazil
South American Games silver medalists for Brazil
South American Games medalists in athletics
Competitors at the 2014 South American Games
20th-century Brazilian people
21st-century Brazilian people